John Paul "J. P." Alcaraz is a Filipino former professional basketball player. He last played for the Philippine Patriots in the ASEAN Basketball League which won the 2010 ABL Championship. During his collegiate days with the Letran Knights he was a member of their championship team in 2005.

References

External links
ASEAN Basketball League
Red Hoops

Letran Knights basketball players
Living people
Filipino men's basketball players
Year of birth missing (living people)
Philippine Patriots players
Point guards